FCI may refer to:

Companies and organizations
 Falling Creek Ironworks, the first iron production facility in North America
 Family Carers Ireland, Irish lobbying group
 Federal Correctional Institution, part of the United States Bureau of Prisons
 Fédération Cynologique Internationale, the World Canine Federation
 Fertilizer Corporation of India, an Indian government-owned corporation
 Fluid Components International, an American manufacturing company
 Food Corporation of India, an Indian government-owned corporation
 Francis Crick Institute, a British biomedical research centre
 Fujisankei Communications International, an American media company

Sports 
 F.C. Indiana, an American soccer team
 FC Ingolstadt 04, a German football club
 FCI Tallinn, an Estonian football club
 Food Corporation of India F.C., an Indian football club
 Italian Cycling Federation

Standards and measures
 Facility condition index, in building management
 fCi, the symbol for the femtocurie, a unit of radioactivity
 Foraminiferal Colouration Index, in geology
 Force Concept Inventory, in physics education
 Full configuration interaction, in chemistry
 Functional Capacity Index, in medicine

Other
 Farm Cove Intermediate, an intermediate school in Pakuranga, Auckland
 French Culinary Institute, now the International Culinary Center, in New York City
 FCC Computer Inquiries, a trio of interrelated FCC Inquiries
 Chesterfield County Airport, in Virginia, United States
 Interoceanic Railway of Mexico, a defunct Mexican railroad company